Tanikaze  was one of 19 s built for the Imperial Japanese Navy during the 1930s.

Design and description
The Kagerō class was an enlarged and improved version of the preceding . Their crew numbered 240 officers and enlisted men. The ships had two Kampon geared steam turbines, each driving one propeller shaft, using steam provided by three Kampon water-tube boilers.

The main armament of the Kagerō class consisted of six Type 3  guns in three twin-gun turrets, one superfiring pair aft and one turret forward of the superstructure. They were built with four Type 96  anti-aircraft guns in two twin-gun mounts, but more of these guns were added over the course of the war. The ships were also armed with eight  torpedo tubes for the oxygen-fueled Type 93 "Long Lance" torpedo in two quadruple traversing mounts; one reload was carried for each tube. Their anti-submarine weapons comprised 16 depth charges.

Construction and career
In June 1942 the ship participated in the Battle of Midway where she was damaged by air attacks. On 5 June, the day after the main Battle of Midway, Tanikaze was sent by Admiral Nagumo to ensure the last IJN aircraft carrier  had actually sunk, to scuttle her if necessary, and collect any survivors.
 
Tanikaze had the unfortunate luck of being seen by 61 US Dauntless dive bombers sent to destroy Hiryū if she was still afloat. After they were unable to locate the aircraft carrier (she had sunk about an hour earlier), the dive bombers turned back to simultaneously attack the hapless Japanese destroyer, since their bombs needed to be jettisoned before landing anyway. Through aggressive maneuvering (zig zagging) by the ship's Captain Katsumi Motoi (勝見 基), not one of the 61 dive bombers managed a direct hit, although shell fragments and shrapnel from a near-miss slashed across the No.3 aft 5" gun turret and triggering an explosion inside the turret that killed all of its six crew. Anti-Aircraft fire from the Tanikaze managed to down one of the attacking dive-bombers, piloted by Lt. Adams of USS Enterprise's VS-5, plunged into the wake of the maneuvering destroyer. A short time later, 5 B-17 level bombers operating out of Midway attacked the Tanikaze from an elevation of 11,000 feet. The bombers scored no hits. Tanikaze counted 11 bombers during this particular attack due to some of the B-17's making multiple attack runs. One of the B-17's accidentally jettisoned its auxiliary fuel tanks along with its bombs and was lost with all its crew (Another B-17 was lost due to fuel shortage on its way back as well). The Tanikaze arrived too late to inspect the Hiryū's hulk, which had already sunk. And returned to rendezvous with the combined fleet.

Later that year, Tanikaze was busy with transport missions to Guadalcanal and in the first months of 1943, she aided in the evacuation of Japanese forces from the island.

Notes

References

External links
 CombinedFleet.com: Kagero-class destroyers
 CombinedFleet.com: Tanikaze history
Googlebooks.com: The Battle of Midway 

Kagerō-class destroyers
World War II destroyers of Japan
Ships of the Battle of Midway
Ships sunk by American submarines
Shipwrecks in the Sulu Sea
World War II shipwrecks in the Pacific Ocean
1940 ships
Maritime incidents in June 1944
Ships built by Fujinagata Shipyards